Moldovan parliamentary election, 2009 can refer to two elections:

 April 2009 Moldovan parliamentary election
 July 2009 Moldovan parliamentary election